Jamie Lane (born 20 November 1995) is a New Zealand rugby union player, currently playing for the Utah Warriors of Major League Rugby (MLR) and  of the National Provincial Championship. His preferred position is lock.

Professional career
Lane signed for Major League Rugby side Utah Warriors for the 2022 Major League Rugby season. He has also previously played for  since the 2017 Mitre 10 Cup and was named in the squad for the 2021 Bunnings NPC.

References

External links
itsrugby.co.uk Profile

1995 births
Living people
Rugby union locks
New Zealand rugby union players
Auckland rugby union players
Utah Warriors players